Prekorje is a settlement in the City Municipality of Celje in eastern Slovenia. It lies north of Celje, just west of Škofja Vas. The area is part of the traditional region of Styria. It is now included with the rest of the municipality in the Savinja Statistical Region.

References

External links
Prekorje on Geopedia

Populated places in the City Municipality of Celje